Tina Cherry is a 1987 dance/soul single by Georgio. The single was his highest entry on the soul singles chart, peaking at number five, yet only reached number ninety-six on the Hot 100. "Tina Cherry" was Georgio's most popular release on the dance charts, reaching the number one spot for one week.

Chart positions

References

1987 singles
1987 songs
Song articles with missing songwriters